Red Ash or red ash may refer to:

Places
Red Ash, Virginia, United States
Red Ash, West Virginia, United States

Trees
 Red ash, Fraxinus pennsylvanica, a species of ash tree native to eastern and central North America
Alphitonia excelsa or red ash, a tree from Australia
Alphitonia whitei or red ash, a tree from Australia

Other uses
Red Ash: The Indelible Legend, a "cancelled" video game crowdfunding campaign. It is uncertain whether the project did get cancelled or development has been put on hold.